John Joseph McVeigh (September 26, 1921 – August 29, 1944) was a United States Army soldier and a recipient of the United States military's highest decoration—the Medal of Honor—for his actions during the Battle for Brest in World War II.

Biography
McVeigh was born in 1921. He was working at a rustproofing company when he joined the Army in his hometown of Philadelphia in September 1942, and by August 29, 1944, was serving as a sergeant in Company H, 23rd Infantry Regiment, 2nd Infantry Division. During a German counterattack on that day, near Brest, France, he directed his squad's fire and, when his position was almost overrun, single-handedly charged the Germans with his only weapon, a trench knife. McVeigh was killed in the attack and, on April 6, 1945, posthumously awarded the Medal of Honor.

McVeigh, aged 22 at his death, was buried in the Holy Sepulchre Cemetery, Cheltenham, Pennsylvania.

Medal of Honor citation
Sergeant McVeigh's official Medal of Honor citation reads:

See also

List of Medal of Honor recipients

References

Sources

1921 births
1944 deaths
Burials at Holy Sepulchre Cemetery
United States Army personnel killed in World War II
United States Army Medal of Honor recipients
Military personnel from Philadelphia
United States Army soldiers
World War II recipients of the Medal of Honor